Lesego 'Pro' Legoete (born 19 October 1976 in South Africa) is a rugby referee on the TMO Panel of the South African Rugby Union.

References

Living people
South African rugby union referees
1976 births